Ali Samooh (born 5 July 1996), nicknamed "Samuttey", is a Maldivian footballer who is currently playing for Maziya.

International career

International goals
Scores and results list the Maldives' goal tally first.

Honours

Maldives
SAFF Championship: 2018

References

External links
 
 Samooh 1st national team match at Sun.mv
 Samooh and Samaam to Maziya at Sun.mv

1996 births
Living people
Maldivian footballers
Maldives international footballers
Association football central defenders